Kaloyan is a 1963 Bulgarian drama film directed by Dako Dakovski.
After a century of Byzantine subjugation, King Kaloyan ascends to the throne, he must implement very flexible foreign policies to strengthen his position. The forth crusade passes through his country and he beats the enemy side in a battle at Adrainpole.

Cast 
 Vasil Stoychev - Tsar Kaloyan
 Bogomil Simeonov - Milat
 Spas Dzhonev - Boril
 Andrey Mihaylov - Manastar
 Magdalena Mircheva - Chichek
 Tzvetana Maneva - Denitza

References

IMDb: https://www.imdb.com/title/tt0311383/plotsummary?ref_=tt_ov_pl

External links 

1963 drama films
1963 films
1960s biographical drama films
1960s historical drama films
Bulgarian historical drama films
Bulgarian biographical drama films
1960s Bulgarian-language films
Biographical films about royalty
Cultural depictions of Bulgarian men
Cultural depictions of emperors
Films set in the 12th century
Films set in the 13th century
Films set in Bulgaria
Films shot in Bulgaria